Longhope railway station is a disused stone-built railway station that served the village of Longhope in Gloucestershire, England. Opened in 1855 with the line, it was located on the Great Western Railway line linking Ross-on-Wye and Gloucester. Longhope station was used in season to export locally produced jam and fruit. The station had a passing loop on what was a single track.

The station has been demolished but the waiting room still remains.

References

Further reading

External links
Longhope on a navigable 1946 O. S. map

Former Great Western Railway stations
Disused railway stations in Gloucestershire
Railway stations in Great Britain opened in 1855
Railway stations in Great Britain closed in 1964
Beeching closures in England